The 2015–16 England Korfball League season is played with 8 teams. Trojans KC are the defending champions.

Teams

A total of 8 teams will be taking part in the league: The best six teams from the 2014-15 season and the number 1 and 2 of the 2014-15 promotion/relegation play-offs.

Regular Season Table

Final Stages

References

External links
 Official website England Korfball League

England Korfball League
England
England
Korfball
Korfball